The Somerset Historical Center  is a rural history museum for the southwestern part of the U.S. State of Pennsylvania and is 4 miles (6 km) north of Somerset. The museum is part of the Pennsylvania Historical and Museum Commission.

References
 Official Somerset Historical Center website

Museums in Somerset County, Pennsylvania
Open-air museums in Pennsylvania
Rural history museums in Pennsylvania
Houses in Somerset County, Pennsylvania